Weekend at Thrackley is a 1934 detective novel by the British writer Alan Melville. A whodunit with comic overtones, it takes the form of a country house mystery, a genre at its height during the decade. His debut novel, it was a commercial success and led to him giving up his job in the timber trade to become a full-time writer. It was reissued in 2018 by the British Library Publishing as part of a group of crime novels from the Golden Age of Detective Fiction.

Synopsis
Jim Henderson is one of six guests invited by Edwin Carson, an avid collector of precious gems to his gloomy country estate at Thrackley.

Film adaptation
In 1952 it was adapted into the film Hot Ice directed by Kenneth Hume and starring John Justin, Barbara Murray and Ivor Barnard.

References

Bibliography
 Clinton, Franz Anthony. British Thrillers, 1950-1979: 845 Films of Suspense, Mystery, Murder and Espionage. McFarland, 2020.
 Goble, Alan. The Complete Index to Literary Sources in Film. Walter de Gruyter, 1999.
 Hubin, Allen J. Crime Fiction, 1749-1980: A Comprehensive Bibliography. Garland Publishing, 1984.

1934 British novels
British mystery novels
Novels by Alan Melville
Novels set in England
British detective novels
British novels adapted into films